"Paid My Dues" is a song by American rapper NF, released on December 3, 2019 as the lead single from his 2021 mixtape Clouds (The Mixtape). It was written and produced by NF, Tommee Profitt, and Cole Walowac, a.k.a. Saint X. The song discusses NF's critics and their hypocrisy, showing how he made his path to success and overcoming obstacles that he faced along the way. A music video was released the same day as the song. This is currently NF's fastest song at 9.2 syllables per second at its fastest point.

Composition and lyrics 
In the song, NF raps about the audacity for critics to have an opinion on his music and the criticism he receives, before  criticizing them himself, stating "I read your article, it kinda hurt me / I don't know who hired you or what your friends say in your circle / But the fact that you released it tells me two things are for certain: / They get paid for trashin' people, I get paid 'cause I stay workin'". He then continues by going into the topic of facing his battles, overcoming them, and working to produce the content that made him successful. It has a similar theme to his previous album, The Search, showing how he is lost and finding his way out.

Critical reception 
A contributor from Billboard says that he "kick[ed] the song into an even higher gear with his trademark rapid-fire delivery", with Jonathan Currinn from CelebMix stating that "he certainly doesn't disappoint."

Personnel 
Credits adapted from Tidal.

 Nate Feuerstein – composer, lyricist, producer
 Tommee Profitt – composer, lyricist, producer, mastering engineer, mixer, studio personnel
 Cole Walowac/Saint X – lyricist, producer

Charts

Certifications

References 

2019 singles
2019 songs
NF (rapper) songs
Songs written by Tommee Profitt
Songs written by NF (rapper)